Henri Lepage (born 21 April 1941) is a French libertarian essayist.

He is most famous for his book Demain le Capitalisme ("Capitalism Tomorrow"), in which, in 1978, he presented an overview of the new libertarian thinkers. The book has been translated into a dozen languages. It is considered important for the early spread of neoliberalism in Sweden. Lepage is a member of the Mont Pelerin Society.

References

External links
 Lepage's blog
 

French essayists
French political writers
1941 births
Living people
Anarcho-capitalists
French libertarians
French male non-fiction writers